Iglesia de San Pedro may refer to:

 Iglesia de San Pedro (Alles), a church in Asturias, Spain
 Iglesia de San Pedro (Con), a church in Asturias, Spain
 Iglesia de San Pedro (Ese de Calleras), a church in Asturias, Spain
 Iglesia de San Pedro (Huasco), a church in the Atacama Region, Chile
 Iglesia de San Pedro (La Felguera)
 Iglesia de San Pedro (Mestas de Con), a church in Asturias, Spain
 Iglesia de San Pedro (Pola de Siero), a church in Asturias, Spain
 Church of San Pedro, Puebla, a church in Puebla, Mexico